Running Against Time is a 1990 American science fiction television film directed by Bruce Seth Green, written by Stanley Shapiro and Robert Glass, and starring Robert Hays, Catherine Hicks, and Sam Wanamaker. Based on Shapiro's 1986 novel A Time to Remember, the film is about a college professor who travels back in time in an attempt to prevent the assassination of John F. Kennedy. The film was Shapiro's final work; it aired on the USA Network on November 21, 1990, four months after his death, and was dedicated to his memory.

Plot 

A college professor, who has not recovered after the death of his brother in Vietnam, hears rumors about a famous professor working on a time machine. He meets him and persuades the professor to send him back in time in order to stop the assassination of John F. Kennedy and the Vietnam War, but things don't go according to plan.

Cast 
 Robert Hays as David Rhodes
 Catherine Hicks as Laura Whittaker
 Sam Wanamaker as Hendryk Koopman, Ph.D.
 Wayne Tippit as FBI Agent Landry
 James DiStefano as Lee Harvey Oswald
 Paul Scherrer as Chris Rhodes
 Brian Smiar as President Lyndon B. Johnson
 Milt Tarver as FBI Agent Clemens
 Russ Marin as Chris's Doctor
 Julie Ariola as Mrs. Rhodes
 Duncan Gamble as Mr. Rhodes
 Damion Stevens as Young David
 Michael Whaley as Security Guard

Reception 
Ken Tucker, writing for Entertainment Weekly called the movie "simultaneously solemn and wacky" but "not without charm". The LA Times compared it unfavorably to the Back to the Future films.

Years later, the similarities and differences with Stephen King's novel 11/22/63 and its TV adaptation, were referenced by critics.

References

External links 

 

1990 television films
1990 films
1990 science fiction films
1990s American films
1990s English-language films
American science fiction television films
Cultural depictions of Lee Harvey Oswald
Cultural depictions of Jack Ruby
English-language science fiction films
Films about the assassination of John F. Kennedy
Films about time travel
Films based on American novels
Films based on science fiction novels
Films scored by Don Davis (composer)
Television films based on books
Time travel in television
USA Network original films